Bellmunt del Priorat is a municipality in the comarca of Priorat, Tarragona, Catalonia, Spain.

Much like the rest of the comarca, Bellmunt has very active wine production, although the climate is one of the warmest to be found.

References

External links
 Government data pages 

Municipalities in Priorat